ZION, was a joshi puroresu (women's professional wrestling) single elimination tournament that was promoted by Arsion. The tournament was typically held between August and October each year. The tournament was held from 1998 until 2002, as the promotion folded in 2003.

ZION '98
The ZION '98 Tournament was held on August 31, 1998. It featured 8 competitors and was won by Mariko Yoshida, who defeated Ayako Hamada in the finals. The winner of this tournament earned the right to face the winner of the  ARS '98 tournament winner, who was Candy Okutsu to crown the first  Queen of Arsion Champion. 

ZION Tournament 1998

ZION '99
The ZION '99 Tournament was held on August 22, 1999. It featured 8 competitors and was won by Michiko Omukai, who defeated Mima Shimoda in the finals. Mariko Yoshida, who was the defending champion and was originally scheduled for this tournament, was replaced by Rie Tamada.  

ZION Tournament 1999

ZION 2000
The ZION 2000 Tournament was held on September 17, 2000. It featured 10 competitors and was won by Ayako Hamada, who defeated Mariko Yoshida in the finals. Both Aja Kong and GAMI received first round byes.

ZION Tournament 2000

ZION 2001
The ZION 2001 Tournament was held on September 22, 2001. It featured 8 competitors and was won by GAMI, who defeated Azumi Hyuga in the finals. 

ZION Tournament 2001

ZION 2002
The ZION 2002 Tournament was held on October 7th, 2002. It featured 10 competitors and was won by Mariko Yoshida, who defeated  noki-A in the finals. 

ZION Tournament 2002

References

Arsion
Women's professional wrestling tournaments